Andrey Kuznetsov was the defending champion but chose not to defend his title.

Leonardo Mayer won the title after defeating Filip Krajinović 7–6(7–3), 7–5 in the final.

Seeds

Draw

Finals

Top half

Bottom half

References
Main Draw
Qualifying Draw

Antonio Savoldi-Marco Co - Trofeo Dimmidisi - Singles
Antonio Savoldi–Marco Cò – Trofeo Dimmidisì